Zeta Chi is a fraternity located at Baker University in Baldwin City, Kansas. It is the oldest independent fraternity in the western United States, and the fraternity of two of Baker University’s Rhodes Scholars.

History 

Zeta Chi was founded on May 23, 1905 by 16 men who did not wish to join any of the previously existing fraternities at Baker University. By 1915 it reported 79 living undergraduate and alumni members.

Throughout the 20th Century the fraternity grew, eventually moving to its current headquarters on 903 Eighth Street, which was previously the house of the University President. During a 1911 visit to campus, President William Howard Taft stayed at the house belonging Professor William Markham which later became the Zeta Chi house.

In the mid 2000s the fraternity struggled with small pledge classes and repeated academic probation. To help alleviate these problems, in 2007 Zeta Chi officially became a "dry" house (not allowing alcohol on its property).

Philanthropy 
Originally, Zeta Chi was philanthropically affiliated with the Special Olympics, raising money for local chapters and spreading awareness of their activities. Most prominent among the member's activities is their annual Polyeuphany event, a benefit concert in which students and community members share their talents to raise money.

Notable alumni
 Warren Ortman Ault
 Jared J. Grantham
 Raymond Pruitt

References

Local fraternities and sororities
Fraternities and sororities in the United States
Student organizations established in 1905
1905 establishments in Kansas